Can You Keep a Secret? is a 2019 American independent romantic comedy film directed by Elise Duran and stars Alexandra Daddario and Tyler Hoechlin. It is based on the 2003 novel of same name by Sophie Kinsella, with the screenplay adapted by Peter Hutchings.

Can You Keep a Secret? was made available through video on demand in North America on September 13, 2019, with a limited theatrical release in foreign markets, where it earned total box office of $1.6 million.

Plot

Emma Corrigan is a New York junior marketing representative at Panda, an organic food company, in Chicago for a sales meeting. The client declines her pitch. Emma gets drunk on the flight home. When the plane hits turbulence, she thinks she will die, and reveals her personal and professional woes to a handsome stranger, including her dissatisfaction with her boyfriend, Connor. Connor meets her at the airport and suggests they move in together. She agrees but regrets it the next morning.

Back at work, Emma prepares for the visit by Panda CEO Jack Harper. When he arrives, he is the handsome stranger from the plane. He agrees not to say anything or fire her, if she in return does not reveal that he was in Chicago.

In a marketing meeting Emma suggests that the target demographic for their "Panda Bites" product line should not be millennials, but the elderly. Connor and other coworkers say the product should simply be axed. Emma later asks Nick, the rep responsible for Panda Bites, for a cut of the marketing budget to test her theory.

Emma calls Connor to the archive room for spontaneous sex in an attempt to reinvigorate their relationship. When Connor refuses, Emma breaks up with him. Jack asks her out to dinner and the two begin a passionate relationship. Jack, however, remains secretive. Emma's roommate and best friend, Lissy, cautions her that their relationship may be too one-sided.

Jack discusses Panda's products on television with the office watching. He describes the company's new target demographic as the "girl on the street", and going into greater detail begins describing Emma, listing all of her secrets. Although he doesn't name her, her coworkers realize it is her and begin mocking her. Jack realizes too late what he's done. Emma refuses to take his calls. When he finds her at a coffee shop, Emma demands to know why he has been going to Chicago. Jack is reluctant and Emma leaves. Lissy and their other roommate, Gemma, suggest Emma get even by revealing his secrets. Gemma suggests a tabloid reporter friend help find details about Chicago but Emma declines.

At a marketing meeting, boss Cybill congratulates Nick for the ad in a magazine for the elderly which has paid off. When he takes all the credit, Emma calls him out, and requests a promotion she was promised. Cybill agrees.

Jack reveals the reason for his trips to Chicago: he has been working to ensure that his goddaughter stays out of the spotlight after the death of her father so she can have a normal life. Gemma arrives just then with her reporter friend and Jack leaves in anger. Emma tracks him down on a plane back to Chicago. She assures him she told the reporter nothing and expresses gratitude that he loved her when she was her true self. He then begins to reveal all of his secrets to her.

Cast

Reception

Critical response 
Can You Keep a Secret? received predominantly negative reviews from critics.

Nick Allen of Roger Ebert.com gave it a 1.5 stars. It said: "“Can You Keep a Secret?” doesn’t elicit warm laughs so much as heavy sighs, even though the film has some zippiness—there’s a slapstick spirit to the movie that doesn’t shine because the jokes are plain, the couple is tough to root for, and the general tension behind this weird situation is on the lazier side of rom-com premises. Romance is hard, and comedy even more so, but “Can You Keep a Secret?” too openly tries to skip through both."

Alan Pergament of The Buffalo News, upon stumbling upon a television rerun of the film, praised the cameo appearance of Kate Welshofer, a WGRZ news reporter who makes a cameo in the film, but panned the remainder of the film, stating that he "bailed" shortly after Welshofer's appearance.

Box office
Can You Keep a Secret? had a limited theatrical release, only in foreign markets, where it earned total box office of US$1.6 million.

References

External links
 

2019 romantic comedy films
2019 films
American romantic comedy films
Films based on British novels
Vertical Entertainment films
Sophie Kinsella
Films shot in New York City
Films set in New York City
2010s English-language films
2010s American films